Houston's Luna Park,  was an amusement park that was operated from 1924 until about 1934. The  "Coney Island of Texas" was built at a cost of $325,000 and featured a carousel, picnic areas, live entertainment (including diving horses), a dance hall with spring-supported floors, and various mechanical rides, including the Giant Skyrocket roller coaster. At night the park (located near 2200 Houston Avenue) was bathed in the light emitted from 50,000 light bulbs. While it was a trolley park, Houston's Luna Park was one of the first amusement parks to offer free automobile parking to its patrons.

Grand Opening

Located on the banks of White Oak Bayou, Luna Park opened to the public for the first time 26 June 1924. Contemporary press coverage (printed 27 July 1924) stated that the park had “… virtually every variety of amusement device known in the world of showdom.” Houston's first roller coaster, the -tall Skyrocket featured an  drop and was billed (with a length of more than 1.25 miles) as the "largest" and "highest" roller coaster in the United States at that time. The popularity of the Skyrocket was immense as it carried between 2500 and 3000 passengers daily.    In addition, "a monstrous seaplane swing also has been installed in the park, as has a caterpillar, a merry-go-round, dodgem, baby airplane swing, junior Ferris wheel, miniature railway and other devices." The scenic railway was reported to be two feet taller than that of Coney Island's. The pavilion was also advertised as the largest in the American South; live entertainment was offered in the form of aerobatics, little people (billed as Williamson's Midget City), and shows entitled "See America First" and "The Mysterious Sensation."

Controversy and contention

The brief existence of the Houston Luna Park was tumultuous and controversial, from a 1924 lawsuit by a patron who accused park employees of treating her roughly as she was waiting in line for the Skyrocket to claims of discrimination against  Mexican people (a police deputy sheriff was arrested for assaulting a Mexican national but was eventually acquitted) to the October 1924 deaths of three people (two were killed from a fall from the Skyrocket; the third was professional parachutist Montie LeMay, who died after her parachute failed to open after attempting a stunt). The following August, the local barber was stabbed while on the Luna Park grounds.

Activities in Luna Park

In addition to the mechanical rides, Luna Park patrons were offered a variety of activities, including boxing and wrestling exhibitions, dance marathons (with a first prize of $750), beauty pageants, and a variety of outdoor competitions for the entire family. By 1928, the park was observing Mexican Independence Day, with activities organized by the Mexican consulate (including "patriotic speeches, patriotic music…  and the reading of the Mexican Declaration of Independence"). The success of the dancing marathons prompted the park to schedule (for 1929) a "floating marathon" in a water tank specially built for the event.

Demise
The original owners sold the property to a local lawyer (Abe W. Wagner) who held a contest to choose a new name.  The eventual winner was Venice Park.  He also changed the address to 2212.

While the latter half of the 1920s appeared to be the best of times for Luna Park, the 1929 stock market crash was the beginning of a sequence of events that spelled doom for it. People were reluctant to leave home and go to the park after Black Tuesday, and that was not the park's only problem.  The misfortunes that marked the first two years of Luna Park's existence returned, first with the discovery of a man's corpse on the park's grounds in 1930; two years later, a farmer was hijacked in his car while in Luna Park. By 1934, the park had closed; the Skyrocket, built and opened in 1925, was moved to a new amusement park nearby, Playland.

Since then, the northern and eastern edges of the park's grounds have been occupied by two Interstate highways (I-10 and I-45). The rest of the property is currently occupied by various businesses near a small residential development.

References

Amusement parks in Texas
Defunct amusement parks in Texas
1924 establishments in Texas
1934 disestablishments in Texas
History of Houston
Amusement parks opened in 1924
Amusement parks closed in 1934